The 2020 Asian Weightlifting Championships were held in Tashkent, Uzbekistan, from 16 to 25 April 2021. Originally the event was scheduled to take place from 18 to 25 April 2020 but was postponed to 16 to 25 April 2021 because of the COVID-19 pandemic. It was the 49th men's and 30th women's championship.

Medal summary

Men

Women

Medal table 

Ranking by Big (Total result) medals 

Ranking by all medals: Big (Total result) and Small (Snatch and Clean & Jerk)

Team ranking

Men

Women

Participating nations 
176 athletes from 26 nations competed.

 (5)
 (2)
 (20)
 (5)
 (6)
 (7)
 (14)
 (19)
 (17)
 (2)
 (1)
 (3)
 (2)
 (1)
 (1)
 (1)
 (9)
 (1)
 (6)
 (1)
 (15)
 (4)
 (2)
 (11)
 (18)
 (3)

Men's results

55 kg

61 kg

67 kg

73 kg

81 kg

89 kg

96 kg

102 kg

109 kg

+109 kg

Women's results

45 kg

49 kg

55 kg

59 kg

64 kg

71 kg

76 kg

81 kg

87 kg

+87 kg

References

External links 
 Results Book
 Results

Asian Weightlifting Championships
Asian Weightlifting Championships
Weightlifting
Asian Weightlifting Championships
International weightlifting competitions hosted by Uzbekistan
Sport in Tashkent
Asian Weightlifting Championships
Asian Weightlifting